Paroxya is a genus of spur-throated grasshoppers in the family Acrididae. There are about eight described species in the genus Paroxya.

Species
These eight species belong to the genus Paroxya:
 Paroxya atlantica Scudder, 1877 i c g b (Atlantic grasshopper)
 Paroxya bermudensis Rehn, J.A.G., 1909 c g
 Paroxya clavuliger (Serville, 1839) i b (olive-green swamp grasshopper)
 Paroxya clavuligera (Serville, 1838) c g
 Paroxya dissimilis Morse, 1905 c g
 Paroxya hoosieri (Blatchley, 1892) i c g
 Paroxya paroxyoides (Scudder, 1897) i c g
 Paroxya recta Scudder, 1877 i c g
Data sources: i = ITIS, c = Catalogue of Life, g = GBIF, b = Bugguide.net

References

Further reading

External links

 

Melanoplinae
Articles created by Qbugbot